The South Croydon Football Club is an Australian rules football club located in South Croydon, Victoria. They play in Division 1 of the Eastern Football League.

History
The South Croydon Football Club was founded in 1969 and fielded its first senior side in the same year.

The club has won senior premierships in 3rd division of the Eastern Football League in 1973, 2001 and 2006. 
The club has won senior premierships in 2nd division of the Eastern Football League in 1983, 1988, 1991 and 2009.
The club has been in the 1st division of the Eastern Football League since 2010 and won the 2017 1st division premiership, the club's first top flight premiership in history.

VFL/AFL players
 Matt Jones - 
 Brett Montgomery - Western Bulldogs Port Adelaide Football Club
 Lukas Markovic - Western Bulldogs 
 Chris Hollow St Kilda Football Club

References

External links
 Official Eastern Football League website

Eastern Football League (Australia) clubs
Australian rules football clubs established in 1969
1969 establishments in Australia
Australian rules football clubs in Melbourne
Sport in the City of Maroondah